Juan Darién: A Carnival Mass is a musical with music and lyrics by Elliot Goldenthal and a book by Goldenthal and Julie Taymor. The musical premiered Off-Broadway in 1988 in the former St. Clement's Church. It was subsequently reworked and refined before playing on Broadway in 1996 at the Vivian Beaumont Theatre, directed by Taymor. The musical, based on a modern fable of the same name by Horacio Quiroga, is set in the jungle in South America, with a jaunty skeletal Death ever present. Its story concerns an orphaned jaguar cub who is miraculously transformed into a human child by the compassion of a woman who has lost her own baby; the boy must then confront the savagery of human civilization. The production employs masked actors and puppets, and the score includes elements of Latin American folk music and the Requiem Mass. The piece was revived and toured extensively.

History
Goldenthal collaborated closely with the musical's director, and his romantic partner, Julie Taymor to create a score that would complement their off-beat concept, blending musical styles with a carnival version of a Requiem Mass sung in Latin and Spanish, primal jungle calls, sharp-edged jazz and hints of minimalism. It was well received by critics. Goldenthal played the small role of Circus Barker/Streetsinger. The piece is sometimes described as a passion play.

Track listing
 Agnus Dei (2:02)
 Lacrymosa / Mr. Bones Fanfare (8:56)
 Jaguar Cub Approach (1:48)
 Mr. Bones' Two-Step (0:55)
 The Hunter's Entrance (1:37)
 Gloria (2:39)
 Initiation (1:11)
 A Round at Midnight (1:52)
 Sanctus (2:08)
 School (3:51)
 Recordare (4:12)
 Carnaval (7:45)
 Lullabye – Lyrics by Elliot Goldenthal (2:47)
 Trance – Lyrics by Horacio Quiroga (2:18)
 Dies Irae (12:17)
 Lacrymosa II / Retribution (3:32)

Crew/performers
Music Composed by Elliot Goldenthal
Recording Produced by Joel Iwataki
Directed by Julie Taymor, Musical Direction by Richard Cordova
Recorded and Mixed by Joel Iwataki
Juan (Boy Soprano): Devin Provenzano
Mother (Contralto): Andrea Frierson Toney
Circus Barker/Streetsinger (Baritone): Elliot Goldenthal

References

External links
 The album at Goldenthal's website
 Juan Darién: A Carnival Mass at the Internet Broadway Database
 The album at the Sony Classical website

Compositions by Elliot Goldenthal
Elliot Goldenthal albums
1996 soundtrack albums
Theatre soundtracks
1988 compositions